Julius Christian Johannes Zeller (24 June 1822, Mühlhausen am Neckar – 31 May 1899, Cannstatt) was a German mathematician.

Originally trained in mathematics, geography and theology, in 1874 Zeller became Director of the Seminary in Markgröningen and a girls' orphanage. In 1882 he became a member of the Société Mathématique de France. The following year, on 16 March 1883, he delivered a short account of his congruence relation (Zeller's congruence), which was published in the society's journal.

He was later awarded the Order of Friedrich, First Class, and the Ritterkreuz of Württemberg. He retired in 1898, and died in the following summer.

Works

On calendrical calculations
Each of these four similar papers deals firstly with the day of the week and secondly with the date of Easter Sunday, for the Julian and Gregorian Calendars.
 Die Grundaufgaben der Kalenderrechnung auf neue und vereinfachte Weise gelöst, Zeller, Chr., Württembergische Vierteljahrshefte für Landesgeschichte, Jahrgang V 1882. 
 Problema duplex Calendarii fundamentale par M. Ch. Zeller, Bulletin de la Société Mathématique de France, vol.11, Séance du 16 mars 1883
 Kalender-Formeln von Rektor Chr. Zeller, Mathematisch-naturwissenschaftliche Mitteilungen des mathematisch-naturwissenschaftlichen Vereins in Württemberg, Ser. 1, 1 1885
 Kalender-Formeln von Chr. Zeller, Acta Mathematica, Vol. 9 1886-87, Nov 1886

He also produced a reference card, Das Ganze der Kalender-Rechnung.

On number theory
See number theory.

 Ein neuer Beweis des Reziprozitäts-Theorems, Berlin 1872
 De numeris Bernoulli eorumque compositione ex numeris integris et reciprocis primis, Paris 1881 
 Zu Eulers Rekursionsformel für die Divisorensummen, Stockholm 1884

External links
Biography(in German)
Mainly on Zeller's algorithms

1822 births
1899 deaths
19th-century German mathematicians